The second and final season of the American cable television series Cloak & Dagger, based on the Marvel Comics characters of the same name, sees Tandy Bowen (Dagger) and Tyrone Johnson (Cloak) use their superpowers together. It is set in the Marvel Cinematic Universe (MCU), sharing continuity with the films and other television series of the franchise. The season is produced by ABC Signature Studios, Marvel Television, and Wandering Rocks Productions, with Pokaski serving as showrunner.

Olivia Holt and Aubrey Joseph star as Bowen and Johnson, with Gloria Reuben, Andrea Roth, J. D. Evermore, and Emma Lahana also starring. In July 2018, the series was renewed for a second season, with filming beginning that October.

The season premiered on April 4, 2019, and concluded on May 30 on Freeform. Freeform canceled the series on October 24, 2019.

Episodes

Cast and characters

Main

 Olivia Holt as Tandy Bowen / Dagger
 Aubrey Joseph as Tyrone "Ty" Johnson / Cloak
 Gloria Reuben as Adina Johnson
 Andrea Roth as Melissa Bowen
 J. D. Evermore as James Connors
 Emma Lahana as Brigid O'Reilly and Mayhem

Recurring

 Miles Mussenden as Otis Johnson
 Noëlle Renée Bercy as Evita Fusilier
 Angela Davis as Chantelle Fusilier
 Dilshad Vadsaria as Avandalia "Lia" Dewan
 Brooklyn McLinn as Andre Deschaine / D'Spayre
 Cecilia Leal as Mikayla Bell
 Joshua J. Williams as Solomon

Notable guests

 Jaime Zevallos as Francis Delgado
 Carl Lundstedt as Liam Walsh
 Andy Dylan as Nathan Bowen
 Ally Maki as Mina Hess
 Lane Miller as Kenneth Fuchs
 Marqus Clae as Billy Johnson
 Gralen Banks as Choo Choo Broussard
 Dalon J. Holland as Duane Porter
 Justin Sams as Baron Samedi

Production

Development
On July 20, 2018, Freeform renewed the series for a 10-episode second season.

Writing
The majority of the writers for the first season return for the second. During the first season, showrunner Joe Pokaski noted the final episode would leave "some stuff open, intentionally" to be addressed in the second season, though its post-credit scene was "tremendously definitive" and would "help define some of the" direction for the second season; this scene establishes Brigid O'Reilly as a threat to the heroes, while the announcement trailer for the second season teased the inclusion of her comics alter ego Mayhem. Pokaski compared the character to the villain Killmonger from Marvel's Black Panther (2018) in that he believed she would be a villain that the audience could relate to, describing her as "kind of what we wish we all were if we didn’t face consequences". He added that a lot of the development that the character has in the first season was written as an origin story for the character to become a villain in the second season. He further described her as "one of the first big scary things" that Tandy and Tyrone face in the second season.

The first-season finale also introduces Tyrone's ability to absorb people into his cloak, and Pokaski said that Tyrone is "a doorway to something" and "we’re going to step into that doorway a little more" in the second season. Pokaski enjoyed being able to unfold the characters' powers like this so they could be tied to emotions. Pokaski said the season would explore his favorite element of superhero stories: people balancing their personal life with their responsibility as a hero. He said it would also show how a person can become a vigilante in a way that he hoped would be unique from other installments in the superhero genre. The season also sees the living arrangements of Tandy and Tyrone reversed from the first, with Tyrone now on the run from the police and living in the abandoned church that Tandy had been living in, until she moved back in with her mother at the end of the first season. Pokaski felt this would allow them to explore a side of Tandy that she herself has neglected, as well as showing who Tyrone is without the "brave face" he has been putting on.

The season will also continue to explore vodun and the "Divine Pairing" mythology established in the first season, with Pokaski saying, "We want to respectfully continue to use Vodun as a mirror upon which we show not only our moral, but our psychological abstracts of our characters."

Casting
Olivia Holt, Aubrey Joseph, Gloria Reuben, Andrea Roth, and Emma Lahana return to star in the season as Tandy Bowen / Dagger, Tyrone Johnson / Cloak, Adina Johnson, Melissa Bowen and Brigid O'Reilly, respectively. J. D. Evermore also returns as James Connors.

Former series regular Miles Mussenden recurs in the season as Otis Johnson,  along with returning guest stars Noëlle Renée Bercy as Evita Fusilier and Angela Davis as Chantelle Fusilier. Also returning from earlier in the series are former series regulars Jaime Zevallos and Carl Lundstedt as Francis Delgado and Liam Walsh, respectively. Ally Maki also returns in her guest role as Mina Hess.

Season two added Brooklyn McLinn, Dilshad Vadsaria and Cecilia Leal to the cast as Andre Deschaine, Lia Dewan and Mikayla Bell respectively.

Filming
Filming began in New Orleans by October 18, 2018.

Marvel Cinematic Universe tie-ins
Ben Urich, who appears in Daredevil portrayed by Vondie Curtis-Hall, is referenced in the series. A newspaper article about Luke Cage, written by Karen Page, including a picture of the titular character portrayed by Mike Colter, is prominently featured in the season.

Release
The season premiered on Freeform April 4, 2019, with its first two episodes, and consisted of 10 episodes.

Reception

Ratings

Critical response

The review aggregator website Rotten Tomatoes reported an 86% approval rating with an average rating of 9.1/10 based on 7 reviews.

Notes

References

External links
 

2019 American television seasons
02